Avilova Cave is the cave that is situated in Avilovy Mountains in Belokalitvinsky District in Rostov Oblast.

Geography
Avilovy Mountains are part of Donets Ridge. They are situated on the bank of the river Kalitva. From the riverside, it ends up as a sheer rock and near to its peak Avilova cave  is situated.

History
The cave is called after the name of the elder Avil. He used to live in Ryginskaya cave, but then he moved to this place. He had been living there for 20 years. He got his fame because he had an ability to predict the future as people told. Many locals asked him to advice something. In Peter’s the Great times, in that region occurred a flood and Avil had been taking out of the cave. Nobody knows what had happened to him then.

There is also a secret tunnel buried under the tons of sand. It starts in Avilovy Mountains and comes to its end in Vvedensky temple in Belaya Kalitva. The origin of tunnel is not known.

There are mentionings about Avilovy Mountains in ancient references. They are described as mountains, placed on the left bank of the river Don and they are rather high, as it is written.

The mountains had received their name by that time. There are caves and grooves looking as signs of living there, in the mountains. There are different coins and clay shards near to those objects. The majority of caves were destroyed by stone-throwers.

You need to traverse a narrow precipitous path to get to the cave. The shrubbery blocks the entrance. There is a small cave behind the shrubbery made with an iron instrument.

References 

Tourist attractions in Rostov-on-Don
Caves of Russia